The seventh season of Akademi Fantasia premiered on 9 March 2009 and continued until 16 May 2009 on the Astro Ria television channel. AC Mizal continued to host the show, while Adlin Aman Ramlie, Edry Hashim and Khatijah Hashim joined the judging panel following the departures of Fauziah Ahmad Daud and Ning Baizura. The promotional catch phrase of this season is "Bring Out Your Self-Transformation".

On 10 February 2009, Astro management released the list of professional trainers who would take charge of this season's contestants. Tiara Jacquelina was revealed to be the Principal for this season, marking the first time ever a woman to be given the role as the Principal.

On 16 May 2009, Mohd Hafiz Mohd Suip from Kuching, Sarawak became the winner of the seventh season of Akademi Fantasia, who defeated Khairil Azam Pilus. This season also featured Afiq Hakim Ahmad, who would subsequently become the overall winner of 2015 Anugerah Juara Lagu.

As much as 3.9 million votes were cast throughout this season.

Changes from Season 6
According to the manager of Astro Ria, Khairul Mizan, this season was opened to not only Malaysian citizen, but also to Singaporean citizen. The rationale behind the eligibility of Singaporean citizen to participate in this show was meant to broaden the influence of Astro in Singapore through the popularity of the show which is broadcast through mio TV.

Apart from that, this season was also eligible to established performers who wished to participate in the show. However, the opportunity would only be given to those who are not embedded with any recording or management contracts.

There were also changes in the line-up of this season's professional trainers. Linda Jasmine, who has been the choreographer of Akademi Fantasia since the first season was being replaced by A. Aris Kadir. Ida Nerina served as the students' Acting & Drama coach, replacing Fauziah Nawi. Lastly, Hashridz Murshim was in charge of the music composition which was previously held by Ramli M.S.

Auditions

Auditions were held in the following cities:
 Kompleks Sukan Bukit Jalil, Kuala Lumpur - 17 January & 18 January
 The Zon Regency Hotel, Johor Bahru - 25 & 25 January
 1Borneo South Atrium, Kota Kinabalu, Sabah - 30 & 31 January & 1 February
 Enter K Entertainment, Crown Tower Kuching, Sarawak - 31 January & 1 February
 Kompleks Sukan Bukit Jalil, Kuala Lumpur - 7 & 8 February

List of songs during auditions

Songs for female
 No One – Alicia Keys
 Kalis Rindu - Elyana
 Dikir Puteri - Noraniza Idris
 Karma - Cokelat
 Tari Silat Melayu - Aishah

Songs for male
 Angan Dan Sedar – Mawi
 You Raise Me Up – Josh Groban
 Ketulusan Hati – Anuar Zain
 Hanya Engkau Yang Mampu – Aizat AF5
 Ada – M. Nasir

Contestants were required to be between the ages of 18 to 45, and are Malaysian and Singaporean citizens who are not embedded with recording or management contracts.

Semi-finalists
The top 20 finalists were announced in a special press conference held at Park Royal Hotel, Kuala Lumpur, on 3 March 2009. All of them participated the Orientation Week as well as the Musical Camp (MOKM) which involved guidance classes and qualification assessment such as vocal (technique), vocal (performance), dance, acting and et cetera for six consecutive days.

Those who displayed promising performances would be enlisted to Akademi Fantasia. The final selection was revealed in the second episode of Tirai Akademi Fantasia which commenced on 7 & 8 March 2009. Below is the list of semi-finalists who did not make it to Top 14.

 Abdul Hamim bin Haji Suleiman, 21, Johor Bahru, Johor
 Abraham Edwin "AB" Dungot, 26, Ranau, Sabah
 Cabrine "Cabbie" Blaire Bernard Solibun, 20, Kota Kinabalu, Sabah
 Alpaezah "Faezah" binti Manaf, 20, Keningau, Sabah
 Kelana bin Ayu, 40, Bintulu, Sarawak
 Lizda Nuryanti binti Abidin, 27, Tawau, Sabah

Concert summaries

Week 1 - Student's choice 
Original Airdate: 14 March 2009

The first concert of the season depicted several changes in the show to denote the idea of "transformation" which was related to the theme of this season. The students were introduced in a more charismatic way with the removal of self-tagline. They were also assigned with songs of their choices. Also, the students sang and performed "Menuju Puncak" at the beginning of the concert, unlike past seasons in which students usually performed the theme song at the end of the concert before the elimination process took place.

During concert, Aril, Isma, Adila and Hafiz were commanded for their strong performance. Rini was criticized for choosing a song that did not compliment her voice while Sidi's lack of emotion due to his nervousness did not sit well with the judges. Despite a strong performance, Adila landed in the bottom two with Sidi when the voting line was closed at the end of the concert. However, it was announced that there would be no elimination in this concert.

Week 2 - Medleys 
Original Airdate: 21 March 2009

The second week began as the students were given the songs they were going to perform for the week. Unlike the previous week, they did not get the chance to sing the song of their own choices. Instead, they were assigned with not one but two songs and were required to perform it as a medley. This marks the first time ever in Akademi Fantasia history whereby the students were given two songs to sing as a medley individually.

During concert, Claudia was praised for her promising performance. The judges were also impressed by Hafiz for his consistent performance. Akim was lambasted for not improving his vocal techniques while Obri was criticized for being too nervous and unsure on stage. The bottom two was revealed to be Obri and Adila. At the end of the concert, Adila was eliminated for having the lowest votes when the voting session was closed.

 Special judge: Dato' Yusni Hamid

Week 3 - 70s & 80s 
Original Airdate: 28 March 2009

Qhaud was chosen as the student with the best performance on last week's concert. The departure of Adila affected some of the students as they read the will that she had written for them. For this week's concert, the students were assigned with classic songs of the 70's and 80's. The theme song "Menuju Puncak" was also performed as an a capella to support the Earth Hour campaign.

The judges were very impressed with Isma's performance which was considered as very laid-back and enjoyable. Hafiz was also consistent in his performance as he proved his vocal ability to the audience. After the voting session was closed, Rini was later revealed to be in the bottom two with Obri, despite her entertaining performance which generally received positive comments from the judges. However, both of them were eliminated at the end of the concert.

 Special judge: Kharil Johari Johari

Week 4 - Tribute to Amy Search & Siti Nurhaliza 
Original Airdate: 4 April 2009

The fourth week kicked off with the announcement of Isma as the best performer in the previous concert. For this week's concert, the students were assigned to sing songs that are popularized by Amy Search and Siti Nurhaliza. The twist was that the song would be assigned in reverse gender, meaning that female students would have to sing songs by Amy Search while male students would have to sing songs by Siti Nurhaliza.

During concert, most students received universal praise, notably Claudia, Akim, Isma and Hafiz. Qhaud had to perform his song twice due to the technical problem and despite the chance, he forgot his lyrics. This concert also witnessed the first time ever in history of AF whereby two professional trainers, Fatimah Abu Bakar and Siti Hajar Ismail, stepped forward to rebut the comments made by the juries.

The bottom two was later revealed to be Zizi and Rubisa. However, they both were sent packing in this concert since it was another double-elimination concert. This also marks the history of Akademi Fantasia whereby double elimination took place consecutively.

 Special judges: Amy Search & Siti Nurhaliza

Week 5 - Duet with past contestants of AF 
Original Airdate: 11 April 2009

The remaining students reviewed their previous concert with their trainers and Akim was revealed to be the best performer in last week's concert. Then, they were given their songs for this week which required them to sing duet songs. Surprisingly, the students were given the chance to perform the duet songs with past contestants of Akademi Fantasia.

Isma was given a surprise when she was reunited with her husband cum singer, Zul, who was a former vocalist of band 2 By 2. Aishah was also surprised to know that her duet partner turned out to be Aliff Aziz, and not Vince as what she was told.

At the end of the concert, Sidi became the sixth student to be eliminated from the competition in his second appearance in the bottom two. It was revealed that he landed in the bottom two with Qhaud after the concert.

 Special judge: Adibah Noor

Week 6 - Memoirs of bands 
Original Airdate: 18 April 2009

The week began with Aril being announced as the best performer for last week concert. The students were then given the assigned songs for this week's concert, which required them to sing songs from four prestigious bands which are Kristal, Left-handed, Estranged, and Cokelat.

During concert, each of the student delivered their song with the accompanying music performed by the original band they were representing. Qhaud was commanded for his improvement as it was his best performance yet. However, despite his stellar performance, he failed to attract the votes from the audience as he was eliminated at the end of the concert. It was also revealed that he landed in the bottom two with Aishah after the voting line was closed.

 Special guests: Johan & Zizan

Week 7 - Miscellaneous songs 
Original Airdate: 25 April 2009

Claudia was appointed as the best performer in the previous concert. However, it was noted that if Qhaud was not eliminated, he would have shared the title with Claudia. A challenge was also conducted between the students to create a short song for Nokia.

Then, they were given the assigned songs to be performed in the seventh concert. The concert would feature no specific theme unlike previous concerts in the past six weeks. Nevertheless, for the first time in this season, some students were assigned with English songs.

During concert, all the male students were commanded for their improvement while the females failed to connect with their songs. However, despite his successful performance, Aril was eliminated at the end of the concert as he failed to attract the enough votes from the audience. It was also revealed that he landed in the bottom two with Claudia after the voting line was closed.

 Bottom two: Claudia Fay Geres & Khairil Azam Pilus
 Eliminated: Khairil Azam Pilus
 Special judge: Adibah Noor
 Special guests: Najwa & Fazura

Week 8 - Musical theaters 
Original Airdate: 2 May 2009

The week began with Hafiz being announced as the best performer for last week concert. The students were then given the assigned songs for this week's concert, which required them to sing songs from famous musical theaters in recent year.

During concert, most students received universal praise, notably Hafiz and Isma. The bottom two of the concert was revealed to be Claudia and Aishah. However, both of them were eliminated at the end of the concert since it was another double-elimination concert.

After the elimination, it was announced by the Principal that AFMASUK would be held in order to recruit students who had been eliminated throughout the season. This privilege was last held back in season 4.

 Bottom two: Claudia Fay Geres & Siti Aishah Bujang
 Eliminated: Claudia Fay Geres & Siti Aishah Bujang
 Special guests: Asrul RL2, Tony Yusuf & Cat Farish

Week 9 - Bilingual songs 
Original Airdate: 9 May 2009

The week started off with Yazid being announced as the best performer in last week's concert. The students were then given the assigned songs for this week's concert, which required them to sing two songs; one in Malay and the other in English. The Principal also announced that the AFMASUK voting line would be closed at the beginning of the ninth concert.

Both Isma's and Hafiz's second performance were favoured by the judges in comparison to their first performance. Although Yazid was chastised for not delivering his best, he was lauded for his significant improvement throughout the competition.

At the end of the concert, it was announced that there was no elimination and consequently, all the four students would move on to the final concert. In addition, Aril was announced as the student who is recruited into the competition again after winning a massive vote of 52.45% through AFMASUK and he would be joining the final four in the finale.
  
 Bottom two: Ismaliza Ismail & Mohd Yazid Ibrahim
 Eliminated: None
 Student who is recruited: Khairil Azam Pilus
 Special judge: Ning Baizura

Week 10 - Grand finale 
Original Airdate: 16 May 2009

Akim was noted for his brilliant performance in the previous week, winning him the title of best performer for the second time. Aril had the chance to share his feelings with Siti Hajar about his experience living outside the house since he was eliminated, as well as dealing with negative criticism about him in the internet. Also, the pressure of the competition began to take its toll on Isma, who broke down during the revision of the previous concert. Then, the final song assignment for the students was given, as follows;

In their first performance, Hafiz was criticized as he was too distracted by his choreography. Akim's improvement was noted, although the judges felt that he was not giving his very best; Yazid was castigated for not taking charge of his own music style due to his disappointing performance which was deemed as too heavy and unsuitable for his vocal. While Isma's performance was chastised as being forgettable, Aril became the only one who impressed the judges with his stellar performance, earning him the best performer in the first round.

In their second performance, Hafiz redeemed himself with his brilliant performance, although it was noted as fairly predictable. The judges were amazed with Akim's powerful performance as he managed to command the stadium. On the other hand, both Yazid and Isma's performance was lambasted for being too average and mediocre, while Aril's consistent performance won the judges over as he received unanimous praise for his energetic performance.

The concert also featured performances from the semi-finalists as well as from the previously eliminated students throughout the season, and also from the winner of the sixth season, Stacy. At the end of the concert, the voting line was closed and Hafiz was crowned as the seventh winner of Akademi Fantasia

 Fifth: Ismaliza Ismail
 Fourth: Mohd Yazid Ibrahim
 Third: Afiq Hakim Ahmad
 Runner-up: Khairil Azam Pilus
 Winner: Mohd Hafiz Mohd Suip
 Special guests: Hardstyle Republic, Din Beramboi, Lisa Surihani, Adam AF2, Stacy AF6

Students
(ages stated are at time of contest)

Summaries

Elimination chart

 The student won the competition
 The student was the runner-up
 The student was the second runner-up
 The students were finalists
 The student was the best performer of the week
 The student was the best performer but was eliminated
 The student was re-entered into the competition through AFMASUK
 The student was the original eliminee but was saved
 The student(s) was eliminated

 In week 1, there was no elimination. The accumulated votes were forwarded to the following week's performance.
 In Week 2, the Principal deemed which student was the best performer in the previous concert and the student who won that honour would get a privilege to go out from the Akademi House. The first honour went to Hafiz.
 Week 3, 4 and 8 featured a double elimination concert.
 In week 9, there was no elimination. However, Aril was re-entered into the competition after scoring the highest votes through AFMASUK.

Cast members

Hosts
 AC Mizal - Host of AF Concert
 Sarimah Ibrahim - Host of AF Diary

Professional trainers
 Datin Seri Tiara Jacquelina - Principal
 Shafizawati Sharif - Vocal Technical
 Siti Hajar Ismail - Vocal Presentation
 Genervie Kam - Music & Vocal
 A. Aris Kadir - Choreographer
 Fatimah Abu Bakar - English Language & Motivator
 Ida Nerina - Drama & Acting
 Hashridz Murshim - Music Director

Judges
 Edry Hashim
 Khatijah Ibrahim
 Adlin Aman Ramlie

Season statistics
 Total number of students: 14
 Oldest student: Ismaliza Ismail, 30 years old
 Youngest students: Afiq Hakim Ahmad & Siti Aishah Bujang, both 18 years old
 Tallest student: Mohd Rashidi Mohamad Isa, 6'0.4" (184 cm)
 Shortest student: Siti Aishah Bujang, 4'8" (146 cm)
 Heaviest student: Mohd Rashidi Mohamad Isa, 176 lbs (80 kg)
 Lightest student: Siti Aishah Bujang, 88 lb (40 kg)
 Student with the most collective highest votes:  Mohd Hafiz Suip, 6 times
 Student with the most consecutive highest votes: Ismaliza Ismail, 3 times
 Students with the most collective best performance: Afiq Hakim Ahmad, Mohd Hafiz Suip, & Mohd Qhauhd Abdul Rashid, all 2 times
 Top 3's vote mean (excluding finale): Mohd Hafiz Suip – 1.44, Khairil Azam Pilus - 5.14, Afiq Hakim Ahmad - 4.67,
 Top 3's vote median (excluding finale): Mohd Hafiz Suip – 1, Khairil Azam Pilus - 4, Afiq Hakim Ahmad - 5
 Students with the most collective bottom two appearances: Ahmad Sobri Hasmuni, Claudia Fay Geres, Mohd Qhauhd Abdul Rashid, Mohd Rashidi Mohamad Isa, Nas Adila Mohd Dan, & Siti Aishah Bujang, all 2 times
 Students with the most consecutive bottom two appearances: Ahmad Sobri Hasmuni, Claudia Fay Geres, Mohd Qhauhd Abdul Rashid, & Nas Adila Mohd Dan, all 2 times
 Students with no bottom two appearance: Afiq Hakim Ahmad & Mohd Hafiz Suip

References

External links
 Official Site
 Murai's AF Coverage

Akademi Fantasia seasons
2009 Malaysian television seasons